Ian Smith (1939–2019) was a journalist, businessman and impresario.  He founded the International Gilbert and Sullivan Festival in 1994.

References

1939 births
2019 deaths